The men's freestyle 67 kilograms (lightweight) wrestling competition at the 1958 Asian Games in Tokyo was held from 25 to 27 May 1958.

The competition used a form of negative points tournament, with negative points given for any result short of a fall. Accumulation of 6 negative points eliminated the wrestler. When three wrestlers remained, they advanced to a final round. These 3 wrestlers each faced each other in a round-robin (with earlier results counting, if any had wrestled another before); record within the medal round determined medals, with bad points breaking ties.

Schedule
All times are Japan Standard Time (UTC+09:00)

Results

First round

Second round

Third round

Fourth round

Final standing

References

External links
UWW Database

Freestyle 67 kg